São Cristóvão e São Lourenço (English: Saint Christopher and Saint Lawrence) is a former parish (freguesia) in the municipality of Lisbon, Portugal. It had a total area of 0.08 km2 and total population of 1,612 inhabitants (2001); density: 20,935.1 inhabitants/km2. At the administrative reorganization of Lisbon on 8 December 2012 it became part of the parish Santa Maria Maior.

Main sites
São Cristovão Church
Marquês de Tancos Palace

References 

Former parishes of Lisbon